Paul Nixon (April 23, 1914 – January 18, 2008) was an American cyclist. He competed in the individual and team road race events at the 1936 Summer Olympics.

References

External links
 

1914 births
2008 deaths
American male cyclists
Olympic cyclists of the United States
Cyclists at the 1936 Summer Olympics
Sportspeople from New York City